Desa was the Serbian co-ruler from 1148 to 1153, alongside his elder brother Uroš II, Grand Prince of Serbia; the Prince of Duklja, Travunija and Zahumlje from 1149 to 1162; the Grand Prince of Serbia from 1153 to 1155, and again from 1162 to 1166.

Biography
Desa was the youngest of three sons of Uroš I, the Grand Prince of Serbia from  1112 to 1145. His mother was Anna Diogenissa, a Byzantine noblewoman. The eldest son Uroš II succeeded their father in 1145. Their sister, Helena, married Béla II of Hungary (r. 1131–41). Upon the death of Béla II, Helena and the middle son Beloš became regents of Hungary. Desa initially held the region of Dendra, near Niš, until later acceding to the throne. Desa was an uncle to three kings of Hungary and Croatia.

In ca. 1148, the political situation in the Balkans was divided by two sides, one being the alliance of the Byzantines and Venice, the other the Normans and Hungarians. The Normans were sure of the danger that the battlefield would move from the Balkans to their area in Italy. Emperor Manuel I Komnenos also allied himself with the Germans after defeating the Cumans in 1148. The Serbs, Hungarians, and Normans exchanged envoys, as it was in the interest of the Normans to stop Manuel's plans to recover Italy.

The Serbs under brothers Uroš II and Desa revolted against the Byzantines, when Manuel was in Avlona planning an offensive across the Adriatic. This revolt posed danger to the Emperor if he would attack Italy, as the Serbs could strike at the Adriatic bases. The Serbs next undertook an offensive against Radoslav of Duklja, who was a loyal Byzantine vassal. Radoslav was pushed to the southwestern corner of Duklja, to Kotor, and retained only the coastal area, with the brothers holding much of inland Duklja and Trebinje, i.e. over two thirds of Duklja. Radoslav sought help from the Emperor, who sent aid from Durazzo. At this moment, the Chronicle of the Priest of Duklja ends, presumably because the author of the original text had died. A major war was about to erupt in the Balkans; Uroš II and Desa, in light of Byzantine retaliation, sought aid from their brother Beloš, the count palatine of Hungary. By 1150, Hungarian troops played an active role in Serbia.

Desa's brother Uroš II ruled alone from 1140 until the battle at the Tara river against Emperor Manuel in 1150, when the Byzantines defeated the Serbs and Hungarians. Uroš II was spared and Desa was instated as co-ruler along with Uroš. He is mentioned in Venetian charters from 1150 as a Prince of Duklja, Travunija and Zahumlje, and again in 1151. In 1153 a dispute between the two brothers resulted in Desa and the Serbian court ousting Uroš II. Emperor Manuel I intervened and re-instated Uroš II in 1155, deposing Desa. He tried to engage in diplomacy with Hungarian king Frederick. In the summer of 1165, Manuel I sent an army to pursuit Desa. Desa was granted a safe meeting with Manuel I and was escorted by a bodyguard. Desa gave oaths to Manuel I in a public humiliation after being examined in Constantinople on his diplomacy with Hungary. Manuel put Tihomir on the throne in 1166.

Some have concluded that Desa was the father of Stefan Nemanja, this however is disputed among other theories.

References

Sources

Further reading

|-

|-

12th-century Serbian monarchs
Vukanović dynasty
Eastern Orthodox monarchs
People of the Grand Principality of Serbia
12th-century births
12th-century deaths
History of Dalmatia
12th-century Eastern Orthodox Christians